Lidz is a surname. Notable people with the surname include:

Franz Lidz (born 1951), American writer, journalist and pro basketball executive
Theodore Lidz (1910–2001), American psychiatrist